Pogorelovo is a rural locality (a village) in Sosnovskoye Rural Settlement, Vologodsky District, Vologda Oblast, Russia. The population was 609 as of 2002. There are 7 streets.

Geography 
Pogorelovo is located 26 km southwest of Vologda (the district's administrative centre) by road. Lantyevo is the nearest rural locality.

References 

Rural localities in Vologodsky District